Viswesül Kezehol Pusa (3 November 1954 – 2 January 2017) was an Indian politician from Nagaland. He was elected to the Nagaland Legislative Assembly four-times from Southern Angami II Assembly constituency as a candidate of the Indian National Congress during which he served as the Minister for Veterinary & Animal Husbandry (1998–1999) and Minister for Roads & Bridges and Mechanical from 2000 to 2003 under the S. C. Jamir regime.

References

Nagaland politicians
North-Eastern Hill University alumni
1954 births
2017 deaths
People from Viswema
 People from Kohima
Indian National Congress politicians from Nagaland